Arif Huseynov — Azerbaijani painter, People's Artist of the Republic of Azerbaijan, Honored Artist of the Republic of Azerbaijan.

About 
Arif Huseynov was born in 1943 in Gala village of Baku. In 1960–62, he graduated from the secondary school of art at Azim Azimzade Art School and in 1965-72 he studied at the Azerbaijan State University of Culture and Arts. Arif Huseynov's works are currently being kept at the Azerbaijan National Museum of Art, Moscow State Museum of Oriental Art, Azerbaijan State Gallery, as well as in personal collections.

Creativity 
Since 1975 is a member of the Union of Artists. For more than 40 years, he has been consistently engaged in creativity. As of this period, he was mainly engaged in machine and book graphics.

The portrait works of Arif Huseynov are mostly historical. These portraits cross the narrow realism border. War and military scenes around the portraits have a great impact on the audience. Portraits of historical personalities and literary characters are rich in Arif Huseynov's work. Portraits of poets - Nizami, Fuzuli and Sabir, Tolstoy and Andersen or Azerbaijani generals of the writers have been accurately described. Physical characteristics have been conveyed, and the illustrations has also been able to show their inner world.

In illustrations for many books by local and foreign authors, Arif Huseynov gives a modern interpretation of the traditional principles of Azerbaijan. Illustrations show not only the artist's read, but his perspective. These drawings make the artist one of the legitimate authors of the book. These illustrations make space for readers. Some of the best examples of Arif Huseynov's illustration are: "Fitna" - Nizami Ganjavi, "Words" - Samad Vurgun, "Knight in tiger skin" - Shota Rustavelli and "Doctor Aybolit" by Korney Chukovskiy.

Education
1960-1962 - Art college named after A.Azimzadeh
1965-1972 - Azerbaijan State University of Culture and Arts

Solo exhibitions
2012 - Sabir, "Hophopnama", The Museum Centre, Baku
2012 - Azerbaijani Fairy-tale, Baku
2009 - Galere Berlin-Baku, Berlin
2006 - "Daikokuya" gallery, Tokyo, Japan
1984 - "100 illustrations", Baku - Moscow

Honoured titles and awards
2008 - Pension of the President of Azerbaijan Republic
2006 - People's Artist of Azerbaijan
1995 - Humay Award for the achievements in Fine Art
1992 - Honoured Artist of Azerbaijan

Artworks

References

External links

Visions.az, Illustrating Life - Azerbaijani Artist Arif Huseynov.

1943 births
Azerbaijani painters
Artists from Baku
Living people